Big Tiger was Principal Chief of the council of a dissident group of Cherokee (1824–1828) who followed the teachings of Whitepath (or Nunnahitsunega), a full-blood traditionalist leader and member of the Cherokee National Council who lived at Turnip Town (Ulunyi), on the Large Ellijay (Elatseyi).

Background
Influenced by the teachings of the Seneca prophet Handsome Lake, Whitepath began a rebellion against the acculturation then taking place in the Cherokee Nation, proposing the rejection of Christianity and the new Cherokee national constitution, and a return to the old tribal laws.  The "rebellion" ended with the submission of Whitepath to the more progressive members of the Cherokee National Council.

Sources
Brown, John P.  Old Frontiers: The Story of the Cherokee Indians from Earliest Times to the Date of Their Removal to the West, 1838.  (Kingsport: Southern Publishers, 1938).
McLoughlin, William G. Cherokee Renascence in the New Republic; (Princeton: Princeton University Press, 1992).
Mooney, James. Myths of the Cherokee and Sacred Formulas of the Cherokee; (Nashville: Charles and Randy Elder-Booksellers, 1982).

References

Year of death missing
Year of birth missing
Principal Chiefs of the Cherokee Nation (1794–1907)